Sušje may refer to more than one place in Slovenia: 

Sušje, Črnomelj, a former settlement in the Municipality of Črnomelj
Sušje, Ribnica, a settlement in the Municipality of Ribnica